3rd Ave. El is an American short film made by Carson Davidson in 1955. The film presents four vignettes of passengers riding the  Third Avenue elevated railway in New York City, made shortly before the line closed in 1955. The film was nominated for an Academy Award for Best Live Action Short Film.

Release and reception
3rd Ave. El was nominated for the Academy Award for Best Live Action Short Film at the 28th Academy Awards.

Music
The film's score is a recording of Haydn's Concerto in D for Harpsichord, performed by Wanda Landowska.

Preservation
The film was preserved by the Academy Film Archive in 2010.

References

External links
 
 

1955 films
American short films
1950s English-language films
1955 short films
Films produced by Carson Davidson
Rail transport films
1950s independent films